Bhullar  is a village in Kapurthala district of Punjab State, India. The village is administrated by a Sarpanch who is an elected representative of village as per the constitution of India and Panchayati raj (India).

Demography 
According to the report published by Census India in 2011, Bhullar has a total number of 179 houses and population of 873 of which include 459 males and 414 females. Literacy rate of Bhullar is  76.56%, higher than state average of 75.84%.  The population of children under the age of 6 years is 58 which is  6.64% of total population of Bhullar, and child sex ratio is approximately  813, lower than state average of 846.

Population data

Air travel connectivity 
The closest airport to the village is Sri Guru Ram Dass Jee International Airport.

Villages in Kapurthala

External links
  Villages in Kapurthala
 Kapurthala Villages List

References

Villages in Kapurthala district